Darren is a masculine given name of uncertain etymological origins. Some theories state that it originated from an Anglicisation of the Irish first name Darragh or Dáire, meaning "Oak Tree". According to other sources, it is thought to come from the Gaelic surname meaning ‘great’, but is also linked to a Welsh mountain named Moel Darren. It is also believed to be a variant of Darrell, which originated from the French surname D'Airelle, meaning "of Airelle". The common spelling of Darren is found in the Welsh language, meaning "edge": Black Darren and Red Darren are found on the eastern side of the Hatterrall Ridge, west of Long Town. In New Zealand, the Darran Mountains exist as a spur of the Southern Alps in the south of the country. Darren has several spelling variations including Daren, Darin, Daryn, Darrin, Darran and Darryn.

In the United Kingdom, its popularity peaked during the 1970s but declined sharply afterwards. In England and Wales, it first appeared in the early-1960s, ranking 66th in 1964, and had leapt to 15th by 1974, but fell to 33rd by 1984 and last appeared in the top 100 in 1994, when it ranked 100th.

People

Sports
Darren Anderton, English footballer
Darren Andrews (born 1995), American football player
Darren Bennett (football player), Australian, played both Australian rules football and American football
Darren Bent, English footballer
Darren Braithwaite, British sprinter
Darren Bravo, West Indian cricketer
Darren Byfield, English footballer
Darren Campbell, English sprint athlete
Darren Collins (footballer born 1967), English footballer
Darren Collison, American professional basketball player
Darren Clarke, Irish professional golfer
Darren Currie, English footballer
Darren Daulton, American baseball player
Darren Daye (born 1960), American basketball player
Darren Drozdov, American professional wrestler who competed in the WWF from 1998 to 1999
Darren Fells, American football player
Darren Ferguson, Scottish footballer and manager
Darren Fletcher, Scottish footballer
Darren Flutie, American football player
Darren Gerard (born 1984), English cricketer 
Darren Gilford, Maltese athlete specializing in both the 100 metres and the 4 × 100 metre relay races
Darren Gough, English cricketer
Darren Hall (disambiguation), multiple people
Darren Huckerby, English footballer
Darren Hughes (English footballer), English footballer
Darren Hughes (Gaelic footballer), Irish Gaelic footballer
Darren Hughes (gridiron football), American football player
Darren Jarman, Australian rules football player
Darren Kelly (born 1979), Northern Irish footballer
Darren Lockyer, Australian rugby league player
Darren Lange, Australian freestyle swimmer
Darren Mackie, Scottish footballer
Darren Matthews, best known as William Regal, English wrestler
Darren McCarty, Canadian ice hockey player
Darren McCaughan, American baseball player
Darren Murphy, Irish footballer
Darren Ng, China-Australian basketball player
Darren O'Dea, Irish footballer
Darren Pang, Canadian professional ice hockey goaltender
Darren Purse, English footballer
Darren Ritchie, Scottish long jumper
Darren Rumble (ice hockey), Canadian ice hockey player
Darren Sharper, American football free safety
Darren Smith (rugby league), Australian rugby league player
Darren Sproles, American football player
Darren Till, British mixed martial artist
Darren Turcotte, American ice hockey player
Darren Waller, American football player
Darren Webster, British darts player
Darren Wood, English footballer
Darren Yewchyn, Canadian football player
Darren Young, ring name of American WWE wrestler Fred Rosser

Arts and entertainment
Darren Aronofsky, American filmmaker
Darren Barnet, American actor
Darren Bennett (dancer), British professional dancer
Darren Bett, British weatherman for the BBC
Darren Boyd, British actor
Darren Criss, American actor and singer
Darren Cullen (cartoonist), British satirical artist and writer
Darren Dale, Australian filmmaker
Darren Day, English actor, singer, and television presenter
Darren Espanto, Filipino Canadian singer
Darren Farris, American singer/songwriter
Darren Floyd, British writer, painter and puppeteer
Darren Grant, American Film and Music Video Director
Darren Hayes, Australian singer-songwriter, formerly of the group Savage Garden
Darren Jessee, American drummer for the rock group Ben Folds Five
Darren Jordon, British journalist and newsreader
Darren Kennedy, Irish television presenter and entrepreneur based in London
Darren Korb, American songwriter and composer
Darren Leader, stage name Stix Zadinia, American drummer for rock group Steel Panther
Darren Lim, Singaporean actor
Darren McGavin, American actor
Darren Ockert, British singer-songwriter and producer based out of Miami
Darren Robinson (rapper), American member of the 80s rap group The Fat Boys
Darren O'Shaughnessy, Irish writer and novelist, pen names Darren Shan and Darren Dash
Darren "Whackhead" Simpson (born 1977), South African radio presenter
Darren Star, American television/film producer and screenwriter
Darren Styles, British record producer, disc jockey and singer-songwriter from Colchester
Darren Tate, British trance music producer and DJ
Darren Wilson, American drummer of the Chicago-based indie-rock group The Hush South

Other professions
Darren Chester, Australian politician
Darren Hughes, New Zealand politician
Darren Naish, British vertebrate palaeontologist and science writer
Darren Storsley, founder of Top Teen of Canada
Darren Kimura, American businessman, inventor and investor
Darren Deon Vann, American serial killer
Darren Woods, American businessman, CEO and chairman of ExxonMobil

Fictional characters
Darren Agonistes Cross, supervillain 'Yellowjacket' from the Marvel comic series Marvel MCU movie Ant-Man
Darren Leadfoot, also known as Shiny Wax, a character in the 2006 movie Cars
 Darren Lemming, main character in the play Take Me Out
Darren Osborne, in British soap Hollyoaks
 Darren Woods, a character in the  1985 American science fantasy movie Explorers

See also
Darron
Derren
Darin (name)
Daron

References

External links
 BehindtheName - Origin and History of the Name Darren
 Interesting Facts about the name Darren

Given names
English masculine given names